Jeffrey Allan Maggert (born February 20, 1964) is an American professional golfer who plays on the PGA Tour and PGA Tour Champions.

Early life 
Maggert was born in Columbia, Missouri. He was raised on a golf course in The Woodlands, Texas, where he attended McCullough High School.

Amateur career 
Maggert attended Texas A&M University. He was an All-American member of the golf team.

Professional career 
Maggert turned professional in 1986. Early in his career he played overseas, especially on the Asia Golf Circuit and PGA Tour of Australia. He had some early success, winning the 1989 Malaysian Open on the AGC and the 1990 Vines Classic on the Australian Tour. 

Early in 1990, he qualified for the Ben Hogan Tour, the PGA Tour's developmental tour. He was Player of the Year on the Ben Hogan Tour in 1990 where he won two tournaments. Maggert's good play on the Ben Hogan Tour ensured a promotion to the PGA Tour for 1991. He has won three times and finished runner-up 16 times on the PGA Tour. He has represented the United States in the Ryder Cup three times and in the Presidents Cup once.

In April 2003, Maggert was the 54-hole leader at The Masters, having shot a third round of 66 to charge through the field. He endured a disappointing final round, that included a triple bogey on the third hole, after the ball rebounded off the bunker lip and struck him, and then a quintuple bogey on the 12th after finding the water twice. Maggert would finish in solo fifth place, his career best finish at the Masters.

He withdrew from The Players Championship in 2008 after completing one round, when he learned that his older brother, Barry, had died in a single-engine airplane crash in Gilpin County, Colorado.

Maggert is the only golfer to have more than one double eagle or albatross in major championship play (once during the 1994 Masters Tournament and once during the 2001 Open Championship).

He started the 2012 season on a medical exemption after shoulder surgery in June. His 2011 season was limited to 18 events, making six cuts. He went to Q School to back up the nine starts and $567,086 on his exemption. Maggert could not satisfy his medical exemption and played the remainder of the 2012 season in the Q School/Nationwide Tour graduate category. He still managed to barely retain a PGA Tour card, finishing 123rd on the money list.

Maggert won on his Champions Tour debut in March 2014 at the Mississippi Gulf Resort Classic, becoming the 17th player to do so. He also became the seventh player to win on all the PGA Tour sponsored major tours (PGA Tour, Web.com Tour, and Champions Tour). He finished the three rounds at 11-under-par, two strokes ahead of Billy Andrade.

In May 2015, Maggert won his maiden senior major championship and second Champions Tour event at the Regions Tradition. After finishing in a tie at 14-under-par after regulation play, he defeated Kevin Sutherland in sudden-death playoff on the first extra hole with a birdie.

The following month, Maggert won his second senior major championship with a two stroke victory over Colin Montgomerie at the U.S. Senior Open. He began the final round tied for the lead with Bernhard Langer, but shot a five-under-par 65 to pull clear of the field and claim the win.

On November 10, 2019, Maggert won the season-ending event on the PGA Tour Champions, the Charles Schwab Cup Championship. Maggert won the event in dramatic fashion by holing out a wedge from the fairway for eagle on the third playoff hole, defeating Retief Goosen.

Professional wins (19)

PGA Tour wins (3)

PGA Tour playoff record (0–1)

PGA Tour of Australasia wins (1)

Ben Hogan Tour wins (2)

Ben Hogan Tour playoff record (2–1)

Asia Golf Circuit wins (1)

Other wins (6)
1988 Texas State Open, St. Louis Open
1990 Texas State Open
1994 Texas State Open, Diners Club Matches (with Jim McGovern)
1997 Diners Club Matches (with Steve Elkington)

PGA Tour Champions wins (6)
 

PGA Tour Champions playoff record (2–1)

Results in major championships

CUT = missed the half-way cut
"T" = tied

Summary

Most consecutive cuts made – 7 (1995 U.S. Open – 1996 PGA)
Longest streak of top-10s – 2 (1995 PGA – 1996 Masters)

Results in The Players Championship

CUT = missed the halfway cut
WD = withdrew
"T" indicates a tie for a place

World Golf Championships

Wins (1)

Results timeline

1Cancelled due to 9/11

QF, R16, R32, R64 = Round in which player lost in match play
NT = No tournament
"T" = tied

Senior major championships

Wins (2)

Results timeline
Results not in chronological order before 2022.

CUT = missed the halfway cut
"T" indicates a tie for a place
NT = No tournament due to COVID-19 pandemic

U.S. national team appearances
Presidents Cup: 1994 (winners)
Ryder Cup: 1995, 1997, 1999 (winners)

See also
1990 Ben Hogan Tour graduates
2011 PGA Tour Qualifying School graduates

References

External links

American male golfers
Texas A&M Aggies men's golfers
PGA Tour golfers
PGA Tour Champions golfers
Winners of senior major golf championships
Ryder Cup competitors for the United States
Korn Ferry Tour graduates
Golfers from Missouri
Golfers from Houston
Sportspeople from Columbia, Missouri
1964 births
Living people